
Year 450 (CDL) was a common year starting on Sunday (link will display the full calendar) of the Julian calendar, the 450th Year of the Common Era (CE) and Anno Domini (AD designations, the 450th year of the 1st millennium, the 50th year of the half of 5th century, and the 1st year of the 450s decade. At the time, it was known as the Year of the Consulship of Valentinianus and Avienus (or, less frequently, year 1203 Ab urbe condita). The denomination 450 for this year has been used since the early medieval period, when the Anno Domini calendar era became the prevalent method in Europe for naming years.

Events 
 By place 

 Byzantium 
 July 28 – Emperor Theodosius II, age 49, falls from his horse while hunting at Constantinople and dies soon afterward. He has reigned since 408, mostly under the domination of his Christian sister Pulcheria, who has been allowed to return to court (see 441).
 August 25 – Pulcheria is forced to marry and co-rule the Eastern Roman Empire. She gives the imperial diadem to the Illyrian (or Thracian) officer and senator Marcian, age 58, and is crowned as empress in the Hippodrome at Constantinople, in the first religious coronation ceremony.
 Marcian orders the execution (or assassination) of the unpopular court eunuch Chrysaphius. He discontinues the tribute payments to Attila.
 All the Temples of Aphrodisias (City of Goddess Aphrodite) are demolished and its libraries burned down. The city is renamed Stauroupolis (City of the Cross).

 Europe 
 Spring – Justa Grata Honoria, eldest sister of emperor Valentinian III, sends her ring to Attila the Hun in an effort to escape a marriage being forced upon her by her brother. Now about 34, she has had an affair with an officer in her household and has allegedly plotted to overthrow Valentinian, who has sent her to a convent at Constantinople. Attila announces his intention to marry her, says he expects to be given half the Western Roman Empire as her dowry, and gathers a large Hun invasion force. Flavius Aetius, Roman general (magister militum), musters an army in Gaul of Burgundians, Celts, Ripuarians, Salian Franks and Visigoths under the command of the Visigoth king Theodoric I.
 Angles, Saxons and Jutes invade Britain, marking the beginning of the Old English period (approximate date).
 Remodelling of the Dome of Baptistry of Neon, Ravenna (Italy) begins (approximate date).

 Persia 
 King Yazdegerd II summons the leading Armenian nobles to the Persian capital Ctesiphon, pressuring them to cut their ties with the Western Church.

 Asia 
 Nalanda University (India) is founded (approximate date).

 By topic 

 Agriculture 
 Metal horseshoes come into more common use in the Near East and in Europe, increasing the efficiency of horsepower in agriculture and transportation.

Births 
 February 2 – Justin I, Byzantine Emperor (d. 527) 
 Ariadne, Byzantine Empress (approximate date)
Avitus, archbishop of Vienne (approximate date) (d. 518)
 Chilperic II, king of Burgundy (approximate date)
 Gunthamund, king of the Vandals (d. 496)
 Isidore, Neoplatonist philosopher (approximate date) 
 Pope Hormisdas (approximate date)
 Thrasamund, king of the Vandals (d. 523)

Deaths 
 July 28 – Theodosius II, Roman Emperor (b. 401)
 July 31 – Peter Chrysologus, bishop of Ravenna
 November 27 – Galla Placidia, Roman Empress (b. 392) 
 Chrysaphius, eunuch and chief minister 
 Cui Hao, prime minister of Northern Wei 
 Chlodio, semi legendary Frankish king and supposed great-grandfather of Clovis I (approximate date) (b.390)
 Kālidāsa, Classical Sanskrit writer (approximate date)
 Quodvultdeus, bishop of Carthage (approximate date) 
 Socrates Scholasticus, church historian (approximate date)
 Sozomen, church historian (approximate date)

References